Robert Walsh (born February 23, 1972) is an American college basketball coach.  He served as the head men's basketball coach at Rhode Island College from 2005 to 2014 and the University of Maine from 2014 to 2018.

Biography

Coaching career
Walsh began his coaching career as a student assistant coach at Hamilton. Upon graduation, Walsh was hired as an assistant at Iona College where he spent two seasons until he moved on to the University of San Diego, where he was an assistant coach for one season.

From 1998 to 2005, Walsh was an assistant coach under Tim Welsh at Providence College, marking the second time he'd work with Welsh, as he did at Iona.

In 2005, Walsh accepted the job at Division III Rhode Island College, replacing Jack Perri. In his nine seasons at RIC, Walsh led the Anchormen to eight NCAA Tournament appearances, including the Sweet 16 three times, and the Elite Eight once. Walsh was 204-63 at RIC.

In May 2014, Walsh became the head coach of the Maine Black Bears, becoming the 21st head coach in school history, replacing Ted Woodward.

On March 5, 2018, Walsh and Maine parted ways, ending his tenure with the Black Bears. In his four seasons with Maine, Walsh recorded a 24–100 record.

In August 2019, Walsh was hired as Associate Director of Player Development, Scouting and Recruiting Coordination at Providence College under head coach Ed Cooley. After two seasons at Providence, Walsh joined Rick Pitino's staff as an assistant coach at Iona.

Head coaching record

References

1972 births
Living people
American men's basketball coaches
American men's basketball players
Basketball coaches from New York (state)
Basketball players from New York (state)
Hamilton College (New York) alumni
Hamilton Continentals men's basketball coaches
Iona Gaels men's basketball coaches
Maine Black Bears men's basketball coaches
Providence Friars men's basketball coaches
Rhode Island College Anchormen basketball coaches
San Diego Toreros men's basketball coaches